The Plymouth Raiders was a professional basketball team based in Plymouth, England. The team competed in the British Basketball League, the country's premier basketball competition, from 2004 to 2021.

The club was founded in 1983 through a merger between two local basketball clubs and went on to be the longest-serving and most successful team in Division 1 of the English Basketball League. Between 1996 and 2004, Plymouth Raiders won six different competitions, including three National Basketball League Play-off titles and the National Cup in 2004.

After several years of dominating the second-tier English Basketball League, in 2004 the Raiders moved up to the franchise-based British Basketball League, pitting themselves against the country's elite teams. Their only success in the top-tier competition came in 2007, winning the BBL Trophy, though the team reached a further three Trophy and BBL Cup Finals in later years.

The Raiders announced their withdrawal from the British Basketball League following the 2020–21 season citing increased rental costs of their home venue, the Plymouth Pavilions, as the primary factor though later investigations revealed that the Raiders organisation had accumulated a debt of over £800,000, including unpaid taxes amounting to £161,882.

Following the demise of the Raiders, the city retained it's place in the British Basketball League with the newly-formed Plymouth City Patriots.

History

Foundation and early years (1983–1996)
Plymouth Raiders' origins can be traced back to the mid-1970s with the original National League team Plymouth Panasonic, coached by future Raiders co-founder Frank Pocock ( age 82 of 2020 ) who entered national competition for the first and only time in 1979. Panasonic achieved a respectable 7th-place finish in Division Two before withdrawing during the close season due to a lack of finances, after which they were renamed Plymouth Kanaries and entered into the regional leagues in 1980. Deciding to have another attempt at establishing a National League club, Pocock along with local basketball figures Bob Karruck, Martyn Moon, Keith Mollard and businessman Les Palmer (of the Wrigley's company) formed a consortium in 1983 and merged the Kanaries with local rivals Plympton to form a new club. A sponsorship deal was arranged with pharmaceutical producer Glucodin and the team adopted their brand colours of red and yellow for their inaugural season in National League Division 2. Raiders played their first game on 1 October 1983 at the Mayflower Centre, losing by one point, 75–76 to the visiting Merseyside Mustangs. After an inconsistent start to the campaign, coach Graham Nicholls stepped down from his position and was replaced by his assistant Karruck who led the team to lowly 10th-placed finished in their rookie season. 

Gary Stronach became player/coach in 1994.

The club endured a barren spell throughout the early 1990s and were forced to leave their Mayflower Centre in 1991 due to a leak in the roof. The team underwent a brief nomadic period using venues such as the John Kitto Centre, China Fleet Centre, Ivybridge Community College and even Torbay Leisure Centre, 30 miles away in Paignton, to host home games. The Raiders returned to the Mayflower Centre, now with a brand new roof, in January 1992 and made a brief return to the Play-offs before bowing out to League Runners-up Bury Lobos in the Semi-final. By late 1992, with no major sponsor in place, the Raiders faced more financial troubles and an uncertain future. Following the help of a local newspaper campaign in the Evening Herald, Wolferstan's Solicitors came forward with a sponsorship offer and investment that enabled the club to survive its second financial crisis in six years.

In the summer of 1993, head coach Bob Karruck announced his retirement and was replaced by his assistant Vic Fleming, who led the team to the 1994 National Trophy Final. Raiders were pitted against Sheffield Forgers at their home Sheffield Arena and, despite a spirited performance, they lost by 60–62 to a Sheffield team who would be crowned as Carlsberg League champions the following year. Fleming's tenure lasted only a season as he left to join the Chester Jets and was replaced by long-serving player Gary Stronach, who assumed the role of player/coach.

Golden era (1996–2004)

In 1998 the Raiders lost the league, trophy and NBL Final to Richmond Jaguars.

The 1998–99 season saw the Raiders and Solent Stars finishing the regular season on equal 21–5 records, the title was ultimately decided by a two-point aggregate differential in the head-to-head between the two teams. Raiders rallied a superb Play-off run and following the defeats of Cardiff Clippers, 111–101, and Guilford Pumas, 93–75, they edged out familiar foes Teesside in the Final at Guildford Spectrum, 71–66, securing the Play-off crown for the second time.

The 2000–2001 season saw Stronach recruit arguably the strongest roster the franchise had ever seen, bringing in Todd Cetnar and Terrence Durham, two American imports straight out of Albany and St. Bonaventure University's respectively. The addition of local players Roderick Wellington, Deng Deng (brother of Luol Deng), Canadian Peter Knechtel and Welsh international Nathan Hayes, bolstered an impressive roster and with eight straight victories to open the season, the Raiders were on course to claim the newly rebranded NBL Conference title. The first defeat of the campaign came in the Trophy Semi-final to a Worthing Thunder team that inflicted two further defeats upon Plymouth throughout the season and matched the Raiders all the way in the hunt for silverware. However, it was Raiders who came out on top with a 19–2 record and the Conference crown for the first time in the franchise's history. The season was completed with an excellent run in the Play-offs sweeping aside Sutton (98–68) and Manchester Magic (162–155 over two games), before commanding an 83–77 defeat on Worthing at Wembley Arena and claiming the Championship double.

After two seasons in Portugal, Terrence Durham's return was the only adjustment in a largely unchanged roster for the 2003–2004 season which saw the club accept an invitation to appear in the BBL Trophy for a second time, adding to a tough schedule including the league (now reverted to EBL Division 1), the National Trophy and the National Cup, which for the first time in history didn't feature any BBL teams. Progress through the National Cup provided interest early in the season, and the Final was reached with Teesside Mohawks providing the opposition at the EIS Sheffield, however it was Raiders who walked away with the George Williams Trophy after a close 89–82 victory. The National Trophy was once more unattainable following a surprise defeat to Sutton in the semi-final, but Raiders domination in the league secured another trophy, finishing first with just two defeats to London United and Reading, who finished in second place. The Play-off Final was reached again, but Raiders were unable to add a third title to the season's haul as Teesside, exacting their National Cup defeat revenge, came out on top with an 80–75 win.

Move to the BBL and recent years (2004–2016)
Having firmly established themselves as the dominant force in Division 1, the Plymouth board sought new challenges for the team and to expand the Raiders brand and during the summer of 2004 announced that they had been admitted into the top-tier BBL.

During the 2006–07 season they won eight games in a row and by December found themselves joint top of the BBL. In the BBL Trophy final, at Newcastle's MetroRadio Arena on 4 March 2007, Raiders defeated Newcastle Eagles 74–65 to win their first top-flight title.

In the league, Raiders constantly held a Play-off position for the majority of the season and though qualifying with ease, just missed out on home advantage with a 5th-place finish. A journey into uncharted territory awaited the Plymouth team appearing in their first BBL Play-offs, however it was also a long journey to face opponents Scottish Rocks, as the league's most Southern and Northern teams met in the one-off clash. A dream first appearance to the Finals Weekend for Raiders was dashed by a 6-point defeat, 83–77, but a huge worry was an in-game injury to captain Gavin Love's Achilles tendon, which subsequently forced the Point Guard to miss a call-up to the Great Britain national team. At the end of season awards, Raiders "big-man" Aaron was named in the All-Star first team and 4th in the MVP ballot, finishing the season on 17 points-per-game, 12.4 rebounds-per-game and a field goal scoring average of 59%. On 1 May, the Raiders development programme was awarded with the prestigious Club Mark accolade by Sport England and England Basketball.

With such an excellent season under his belt, star man Carlton Aaron departed the team during the close-season, trying out for teams in South Korea, before eventually signing for a Guildford side preparing for their first appearance in Europe's ULEB Cup.

After committing over two decades of service to the Raiders, Coach Stronach was presented by the BBC with a Lifetime Achievement Award at a ceremony in November, honouring the success he has brought to Plymouth. In March they travelled to leaders Newcastle, having won their previous seven league games. They faced Newcastle in the 3rd place game on 4 May 2008, and though losing 54–33 at half-time, edged out their opponents in a tight 96–92 victory taking 3rd place, the best league position in the club's history. With an average of 19 points-per-game, Plymouth's top scorer Andrew Lasker was named in the All-Star team for the 2007–08 season . After being declined by Newcastle and Guildford – who both finished above Plymouth in the league – FIBA approached Raiders with an invitation to compete in the EuroChallenge for the 2008–09 season, which Raiders also duly declined.

After six years of sponsorship from Kularoos, the Raiders board announced during the summer of 2008 a major new deal had been reached with Plymouth-based chewing gum giant Wrigley's Airwaves, reportedly "one of the biggest in basketball history". The extra funds brought in allowed for a bigger budget in terms of recruiting, and within days the signing of Kwbana Beckles was publicised. Beckles came with plenty of pedigree having appeared in Sweden, Switzerland, Israel and spells for NBA teams Atlanta Hawks and Toronto Raptors. Veteran player DeAntoine Beasley took up the new dual role as player/assistant coach, declining a coaching job in the USA while captain Gavin Love, who missed much of the previous season through injury signed a new one-year contract.

In October, the team was boosted with the visit of a FIBA inspection team that approved the use of the Pavilions for European competition matches, providing a top-two finish is achieved in the Championship. In the BBL Cup the Raiders won a two-game Semi-final series against Guildford to reach only their second BBL Final. Their final opponents were Everton Tigers who recorded a 103–49 victory over Plymouth at the NIA in Birmingham. At the end of January Coach Stronach announced the signing of Gerald Robinson, an American with a Dutch passport, from Spanish team Oviedo. A week later, Gavin Love announced he was to retire from playing after 13 years with the Raiders, citing multiple injuries as the reason. In honour of his services to the club, his number six jersey was to be retired at a ceremony on 14 February 2009 prior to a game with Guildford. Israeli Point Guard Haggai Hundert was drafted in from Slovenia to fill the void left by Love. The franchise expanded on its ambitions to play in Europe with the announcement on 16 March, of a co-operation deal with Spanish giants Unicaja Málaga; the alliance will see Raiders coaches going to Spain to gain experience and young players coming to Plymouth to improve their English and education. A 96–73 defeat at the hands of Sheffield Sharks saw injuries to Andrew Lasker, Anthony Martin and Terrence Durham. In April 2009 it was announced that Andrew Lasker had made the team of the season.

In summer 2009 Stronach revealed that the player's budget had been cut by 60–65% for the coming season, citing the economic climate and a lack of sponsorship as the main reasons for the cuts. In June 2009 Allister Gall was named the new captain. In July 2009 James Noel extended his contract. The summer saw the unveiling of a restructured development programme following a merger of Raiders development team with local club Plymouth Marjon Cannons, headed by former Cannons coach George Hatchell.

Eric Flato, a recent graduate of Yale University, was signed in July 2009, and the news was soon followed by the capture of Terry Horton, another American, who was brought in from Germany. In October 2009 Anthony Martin was re-signed following a brief spell at Worcester, having departed the Raiders just months earlier. Former Raiders development talent Anthony Rowe signed on a one-month deal in November. Flato picked up a serious injury in November and subsequently left the club. His replacement was Drew Lasker, the team's top-scorer for the past four seasons, who left during the summer, but who had been without a club. He marked his return in a 69–84 loss to Everton on 5 December.

In February it was announced that James Noel was released from his contract, due to a series of long-term injuries, allowing the team's bench players more opportunity. Form started to improve throughout the Spring, but a double loss to Glasgow and Worthing at the beginning of April ended any hopes of qualifying for the Play-offs with fives games left of the regular season. Two weeks later it was announced by the club that after 24 years of service Gary Stronach was to step down as head coach at the end of the season. Coming as a shock to many fans, Stronach cited the reason for his departure was that "it's time for me to move on, broaden the horizon and see what's out there."

The club started preparations for the new season immediately and ushered in the new era post-Stronach with the appointment of former player and team captain Gavin Love as the new head coach of the Raiders' first team, stepping up from his previous position of Stronach's assistant coach. Love's first signing as head coach came in the form of dual-national American Guard Cody Toppert from Germany. His wife Brittany, a professional football player and United States international, followed him to Plymouth and signed for local team Plymouth Argyle Ladies. Love continued to build the new-look Raiders roster with the signings of England international Taner Adu from Essex Pirates and American import players Otis Polk and Brian McKenzie, straight out of college. British youngsters Matt Guymon and Sam Cricelli were also drafted in soon after however England international Guymon left within weeks of the season opener for personal reasons. With the announced returns of Marriott, Czynienik and Anthony Rowe from the previous season the roster was starting to take shape, but Love was dealt a further blow when fan-favourite Allister Gall announced he would not be renewing his contract for the upcoming campaign.

Ownership Changes, Demise and The Future (2017–2022) 
On 17 July 2017 the ownership of Plymouth Raiders was taken over from Bob Widdecombe to Ross Mackenzie and Richard Mollard. The new owners moved quickly to appoint Louis Sayers as their first player for the 2017–18 season. Following on from this, the owners introduced a brand new logo to form part of a re-branding of the club.

Harnessing its position as the 2nd oldest club in UK basketball history, the Plymouth Raiders maintained their home venue of 20 years at the Plymouth Pavilions, operating and competing successfully throughout this period from 2017-2020, establishing the club once again as a force within UK basketball with some of the BBL's most exciting players representing the club - Donte Nicholas, Rashad Hassan, Josh Wilcher, Joonas Jarvelianen and led by club captain Zak Wells. Raiders also fostered new talent by recruiting Denzel Ubiaro in 2017 who remained with the club for 4 years as he pursued his studies via Marjon. 

The community pathway projects accelerated during this period including the CVL/Youth Development League which were formed providing basketball learning opportunities to hundreds of school age young people across the City. Foxy's Little Ballers brought basketball to juniors in an ever expanding programme catering for all groups and early years learners. Commercially the club had achieved the largest following from within the business community in its 35 year history. 

During this period, plans were put in motion to identify solutions for the club's long term future that would be secured via the model of venue ownership as per Leicester and Newcastle's respective arenas. Club Director/Co Owner Richard Mollard had presented detailed plans to Plymouth City Council and led a consortium of partners to explore the potential for a new venue. These plans continue to provide the blue print for a future venue. 

During the 2018/19 season, the Marjon University programme expanded expontentially under the Plymouth Raiders management and Assistant Coach Danny McGee oversaw the recruitment of 25 aspiring elite athletes joining the Raiders Elite University programme. 

In February 2020 MLA College, under educational business BAU Global, purchased a 60% ownership share of the club. Enver Yucel visited Plymouth on 16th February to present his vision.

MLA College were keen to continue the club's rich history, to bring silverware to the city, and strive to see the Raiders one day competing in European competition.

The following season under the new Raiders owner - 2020/21 - the BBL instructed all teams to play behind closed doors during the Covid pandemic and the BBL were the only indoor sport that operated during this unprecedented season. The Raiders finished in their highest BBL finish in 3rd position with a win/loss record - W21 L9, finishing behind London Lions in 2nd and Champions Leicester Riders. Raiders players during this season included Team GB star Ashley Hamilton, fellow Brits Will Neighbour, Denzel Ubiaro and Andrew Lawrence (injured), Elvisi Dusha with US imports Rickey McGill, Chris Porter Bunton Mike Morsell and Prince Ibeh. 

In March 2021, the Plymouth Raiders reached the BBL Trophy Final, losing 88/82 to London Lions. 

On 8 July 2021, following the Turkish owners Board decision that Plymouth Raiders would withdraw from the British Basketball League for the 2021/22 season, citing increased costs of renting the Plymouth Pavilions as the primary reason, without warning or further efforts to find a solution, all club funding by MLA was cancelled and Cowgills were appointed to oversee the liquidation. 

Liquidators revealed in December 2022 that the former Raiders owners MLA/BAU GLobal had accumulated a debt of over £800,000 during their brief tenure.  

The naming and branding rights of the Plymouth Raiders were bought back by previous co-owner Ross Mackenzie in an open auction.

Logos

Arena

Mayflower Centre (1983–1996)
Plymouth Pavilions (1996–2001)

Plymouth Raiders have played their home games at the Plymouth Pavilions arena since 1996. In basketball configuration the main arena has a capacity for 1,500 spectators, with tiered seating on either side of the court and floor-level seating behind each basket. 

Before moving to the Pavilions, Raiders were based at the Mayflower Centre, a 1,000-capacity sports facility adjacent to the Home Park football stadium in Central Park. The Raiders played out of the Mayflower Centre from 1983 until their move to the Pavilions in 1996, however, due to on-going issues with the venue's roof, the team spent much of the 1991–1992 season playing their home matches at the China Fleet Club, Ivybridge Community College, the John Kitto Centre and Torbay Leisure Centre in Paignton. 

Though the Pavilions arena has been approved by international governing body FIBA for hosting European competition matches, former Raiders' chairman Bob Widdecombe has stated the club's ambition is to move to a new purpose-built arena that would be solely owned by the organisation  and would be more suited to hosting European competition.

In 2021 the Raiders were forced to withdraw from the 2021/22 season due to an increase in the rent for use of Plymouth Pavilions. Plymouth City Council continues to work with Plymouth Raiders to find a solution, with longer-term plans to build a multi-sport arena which has the capacity to deliver a venue for spectator events and act as a home for Plymouth Raiders.

Trophies

League
 NBL Conference Winners: 2000/01
 EBL Division One Winners: 2003/04
 NBL Division One Runners Up: 1996/97, 1997/98 & 1998/99
 NBL Conference Runners Up: 2001/02, & 2002/03

Playoffs
 NBL Division One Play Off Winners: 1996/97, & 1998/99
 NBL Conference Play Off Winners: 2000/01
 EBL Division One Play Off Runners Up: 2003/04

Trophy
 National Trophy Runners Up: 1985/86, 1993/94, 1996/97, 1997/98 & 1998/99
 BBL Trophy Winners: 2006/07
 BBL Trophy Runners Up: 2011/12

Cup
 National Cup Winners: 2003/04
 BBL Cup Winners' Cup Runners Up: 2007/08
 BBL Cup Runners Up: 2011/2012

Season-by-season records

Players

Retired numbers

Current roster

Notable players

 Jermaine Forbes
 Nick George
 Gavin Love
 Ben Mockford
 Gareth Murray
 Anthony Rowe
 Gary Stronach
 Roderick Wellington
 Dean Williams
  Kwbana Beckles
  Pete Knechtel
 Daniel Okonkwo
  Deng Deng
 Pierre Hampton
 Andreas Schreiber
 Carlton Aaron
 DeAntoine Beasley
 Jeremy Bell
 Micah Blunt
  Rod Brown
 Todd Cetnar
 Lehmon Colbert
 Dave Downey
 Terrence Durham
 Chris Hines
 Ted Hotaling
 Chris Hughey
 Andrew Lasker
 Chez Marks
 Jim McGilvery
  Michael Ojo
 Otis Polk
  Gerald Robinson
  Cody Toppert
 Paul Williams
  Jerome Gumbs

See also
British Basketball League

References

External links
Official Plymouth Raiders website
Plymouth Raiders on Facebook
Plymouth Raiders on Twitter

Plymouth Raiders news from the BBC
Plymouth Raiders page at The Herald

 
Basketball teams established in 1983
Basketball teams in England
Sport in Plymouth, Devon
Viking Age in popular culture
1983 establishments in England
Basketball teams disestablished in 2021
2021 disestablishments in England
Former British Basketball League teams